Charles Lee is Director and Professor of The Jackson Laboratory for Genomic Medicine, The Robert Alvine Family Endowed Chair and a board certified clinical cytogeneticist who has an active research program in the identification and characterization of structural genomic variants using advanced technology platforms. His laboratory was the first to describe genome-wide structural genomic variants (in the form of copy number variants (CNVs)) among humans with the subsequent development of two human CNV maps that are now actively used in the diagnoses of array based genetic tests. Lee is also currently the President of the Human Genome Organisation (HUGO).

Education
 1990: BS in Genetics, University of Alberta
 1993: MS in Experimental Pathology, University of Alberta
 1996: PhD in Medical Sciences, University of Alberta
 1996–1999: NSERC Fellow, University of Cambridge, UK
 1999–2001: Clinical Cytogenetics Fellow, Harvard Medical School

Work
Positions held
2001–2003: Instructor, Pathology, Harvard Medical School
2003–2008: Assistant Professor, Pathology, Harvard Medical School
2008–2013: Associate Professor, Pathology, Harvard Medical School
2013: Director & Professor, The Jackson Laboratory for Genomic Medicine

Major research publications
1993: Lee C, Sasi R, Lin CC. Interstitial localization of telomeric DNA sequences in the Indian muntjac chromosomes: further evidence for tandem chromosome fusions in the karyotypic evolution of the Asian muntjacs.  Cytogenet. Cell Genet.. 1993; 63: 156–9
1997 : Lee C, Wevrick R, Fisher RB, Ferguson-Smith MA, Lin CC. Human centromeric DNAs. Hum Genet. 1997; 100: 291-304
2004: Iafrate AJ, Feuk L, Rivera MN, Listewnik ML, Donahoe PK, Qi Y, Scherer SW, Lee C. Detection of large-scale variation in the human genome.  Nat Genet. 2004; 36: 949–51 
2006: Redon R, Ishikawa S, Fitch KR, Feuk L, Perry G, Andrews TD, Fiegler H, ... , Tyler-Smith C*, Carter NP*, Aburatani H*, Lee C*, Jones KW*, Scherer SW*, Hurles ME*.  Global variation in copy number in the human genome. Nature. 2006; 444: 444–54 *Co-senior authors
2007: Perry GH, Dominy NJ, Claw KG, Lee AS, Fiegler H, Redon R, Werner J, Villanea FA, Mountain JL, Misra R, Carter NP, Lee C*, Stone AC*. Diet and the evolution of human gene copy number variation. Nat Genet. 2007; 39: 1256–60  *Co-senior authors
2007: Lee C, Iafrate AJ, Brothman AR. Copy number variations and clinical cytogenetic diagnosis of constitutional disorders. Nat Genet. 2007; 39: S48-S54
2008: Perry GH, Ben-Dor A, Tsalenko A, Sampas N, Rodriguez-Revenga L, Tran CW, Scheffer A, Steinfeld I, Tsang P, Yamada NA, Park HS, Kim JI, Seo JS, Yakhini Z, Laderman S, Bruhn L, Lee C. The fine-scale and complex architecture of human copy number variation. Am J Hum Genet. 2008; 82: 685–95
2010: Conrad D, Pinto D, Redon R, Feuk L, Gokcumen O, Zhang Y, ... , Tyler-Smith C*, Carter NP*, Lee C*, Scherer SW*, Hurles ME*. Common copy number variation in the human genome: mechanism, selection and disease association. Nature. 2010; 464: 704–12 *Co-senior authors
2011: Mills RE, Walter K, Stewart C, Handsaker RE, Chen K, Alkan C, ... , Eichler EE*, Gerstein MB*, Hurles ME*, Lee C*, McCarroll SA*, Korbel, JO*. Mapping copy number variation by population-scale genome sequencing. Nature. 2011; 470: 59–65 *Co-senior authors
2012: Brown, KH, Dobrinski KP, Lee AS, Gokcumen O, Mills RE, Shi X, Chong WW, Chen JY, Yoo P, David S, Peterson SM, Raj T, Choy KW, Stranger B, Williamson RE, Zon LI, Freeman JL, Lee C. Extensive genetic diversity and sub-structuring among zebrafish strains revealed through copy number variant analysis. Proc Natl Acad Sci USA 2012; 109: 529–534
2013: Gokcumen O, Tischler V, Tica J, Zhu Q, Iskow RC, Lee E, Fritz MH, Langdon A, Stutz AM, Pavlidis P, Benes V, Mills RE, Park PJ, Lee C*, Korbel JO*. Primate genome architecture influences structural variation mechanisms and functional consequences. Proc Natl Acad Sci USA 2013; 110: 15764-9 *Co-senior author
2015: Sudmant PH, Rausch T, Gardner EJ, Handsaker RE, Abzov A, ... , Mills RE*, Gerstein M*, Bashir A*, Stegle O*, Devine SE*, Lee C*, Eichler EE*, Korbel JO*. An integrated map of structural variation in 2,504 human genomes. Nature 2015; 526: 75–81
2017: Zhu Q, High FA, Zhang C, Cereira E, Russell M, Longoni M, Ryan M, Mil-homens A, Bellfy L, Coletti C, Bhayani P, Jila R, Donahoe PK, Lee C. Systematic analysis of copy number variation associated with congenital diaphragmatic hernia. Proc Natl Acad Sci USA 2018; 115: 5247–5252
2019: Chaisson MJP, Sanders AD, Zhao X, Malhotra A, Porubsky D, Rausch T, Gardner EJ, Rodriguez OL, Guo L, Collins RL, Fan X, Wen J, Handsaker RE, Fairley S, Kronenberg ZN, Kong X, Hormozdiari F, Lee D, Wenger AM, Hastie AR, Antaki D, Anantharaman T, Audano PA, Brand H, Cantsilieris S, Cao H, Cerveira E, Chen C, Chen X, Chin CS, Chong Z, Chuang NT, Lambert CC, Church DM, Clarke L, Farrell A, Flores J, Galeev T, Gorkin DU, Gujral M, Guryev V, Heaton WH, Korlach J, Kumar S, Kwon JY, Lam ET, Lee JE, Lee J, Lee WP, Lee SP, Li S, Marks P, Viaud-Martinez K, Meiers S, Munson KM, Navarro FCP, Nelson BJ, Nodzak C, Noor A, Kyriazopoulou-Panagiotopoulou S, Pang AWC, Qiu Y, Rosanio G, Ryan M, Stütz A, Spierings DCJ, Ward A, Welch AE, Xiao M, Xu W, Zhang C, Zhu Q, Zheng-Bradley X, Lowy E, Yakneen S, McCarroll S, Jun G, Ding L, Koh CL, Ren B, Flicek P, Chen K, Gerstein MB, Kwok PY, Lansdorp PM, Marth GT, Sebat J, Shi X, Bashir A, Ye K, Devine SE, Talkowski ME, Mills RE, Marschall T, Korbel JO, Eichler EE, *Lee C. Multi-platform discovery of haplotype-resolved structural variation in human genomes. Nat Commun. 2019; 10: 1784.

Awards / Appointments
2007: American Association for Cancer Research Team Award
2008: Ho-am Prize in Medicine
2010: George W. Brumley Jr, MD Memorial Award (Duke University)
2011–21: Honorary Professor, Chinese University of Hong Kong
2012: Vandenberghe Chair Award (Katholic University of Leuven, Belgium)
2012: Chen Award, Human Genome Organisation
2012: Fellow, American Association for the Advancement of Science (AAAS)
2013–: Affiliated Professor, University of Connecticut Health Sciences, USA
2013–15: Distinguished Visiting Professor, Seoul National University, Korea
2014: Thomson Reuters Citation Laureate
2015–20: Distinguished EWHA Professor, Ewha Womans University, Korea
2017–: President, Human Genome Organisation
2018: University of Alberta Distinguished Alumni Award
2018–22: Adjunct Professor, First Affiliated Hospital of Xi'an Jiaotong University, China
2020–: Adjunct Professor, Gwangju Institute of Science and Technology, Korea
2022–: The Robert Alvine Family Endowed Chair

References

University of Alberta alumni
American pathologists
Living people
1969 births
Academic staff of Gwangju Institute of Science and Technology
Recipients of the Ho-Am Prize in Medicine